Fibe is a brand used by Bell Canada to market internet-related services, including copper, fibre to the node (FTTN) and fibre to the home (FTTH) services.

It may refer to:

 Fibe (Bell Aliant), fibre-optic internet, home phone and IPTV in Atlantic Canada.
 Bell Fibe TV, IPTV services in Ontario and Quebec.

Bell Canada